Claire Wang (born 26 April 1979) is a Taiwanese politician. She subsequently joined the New Power Party and won a seat on the Legislative Yuan in 2020.

Personal life
Claire Wang is a Miaoli County native, born on 26 April 1979. After completing a bachelor's degree in geology at National Taiwan University, she pursued graduate study at the University of Southern California in the United States. Her husband, David Liu, also studied there, and the couple later returned to Taiwan. Liu began working in technology, and Wang remained home, to care for their four children. Liu and Wang's youngest daughter died on 28 March 2016, while traveling with her mother. The child was decapitated by Wang Ching-yu as she rode a bicycle along Huanshan Road in Neihu District on the way to Xihu metro station. The child became known as Little Light Bulb, a nickname bestowed by her mother, in media coverage of the case. A visitation was held on 31 March 2016, followed by another ceremony on 13 April 2016. After the visitation, Claire Wang received a condolence letter from Annette Lu, and spoke out against the politicalization of her daughter's death with regards to views on capital punishment. Wang said that she herself "does not support" the death penalty, but also "does not agree" with its abolition.  

In November 2016, Claire Wang was invited to take part in the  Presidential Office Organizing Committee for National Conferences on Judicial Reforms. The sixteen other committee members were businesspeople or legal scholars; Wang served as the sole voice for victims of crime.

After her election to the Legislative Yuan in January 2020, threats against her other children were made online, and she began legal action against the people who made the posts, as well as those who supported the threats.

Wang Ching-yu trial
Prosecutors indicted Wang Ching-yu on charges of homicide and sought the death penalty. The Shilin District Court began hearing Wang Ching-yu's case in June 2016. The first ruling on the case was issued on 12 May 2017; the Shilin District Court sentenced Wang Ching-yu to life imprisonment. The Taiwan High Court heard an appeal in July 2018, and upheld the previous ruling. A second appeal in January 2020 retained life imprisonment as a punitive measure. Another appeal to the Supreme Court was dismissed on 15 April 2020. The verdict was final, and maintained that Wang Ching-yu was subject to life imprisonment.

Political career
Claire Wang was ranked third of twelve candidates on the New Power Party proportional representation party list. Her bid for public office was endorsed by Wu Nien-jen. The New Power Party received over seven percent of the party list vote, and Wang was elected to the Tenth Legislative Yuan. Wang secured three votes in an election for Vice President of the Legislative Yuan, losing the office to incumbent deputy speaker Tsai Chi-chang. Wang was elected to the New Power Party's executive council on 29 August 2020, winning the highest vote share.

References

1979 births
Living people
21st-century Taiwanese women politicians
Members of the 10th Legislative Yuan
Party List Members of the Legislative Yuan
New Power Party Members of the Legislative Yuan
Taiwanese expatriates in the United States
University of Southern California alumni
Politicians of the Republic of China on Taiwan from Miaoli County
National Taiwan University alumni